KWIE (101.3 FM; "Old School 101.3") is a commercial rhythmic oldies radio station in Barstow, California, broadcasting to the High Desert area. It is one of six other stations partially simulcasting KOCP (104.7) from Oxnard, with some diversions for local programming and requests.

External links
 

WIE
Rhythmic oldies radio stations in the United States
Mass media in San Bernardino County, California
Victor Valley
Barstow, California
Victorville, California
Radio stations established in 2016
2016 establishments in California